This is a list of the number-one hits of 1970 on Italian Hit Parade Singles Chart.

Number-one artists

See also
1970 in music

References

1970 in Italian music
Italy
1970